The Babe Pratt Trophy is an annual award presented to the best defenceman on the Vancouver Canucks of the National Hockey League (NHL). One of six annual team awards presented to Canucks players, it is voted by the team fans and is presented at the last home game of the regular season. The most recent recipient is Quinn Hughes, who won it for the first time in the 2019–20 NHL season

History
The Babe Pratt Trophy was first awarded for the 1972–73 season as the Premier's Trophy. After the death of Hall of Fame defenceman and Canucks goodwill ambassador Babe Pratt, the trophy was renamed in honour of him for the 1989–90 season. Originally, the trophy's recipient was decided by local media, but is now decided by fan vote.

The most prolific award winners in the trophy's history have been:

Mattias Ohlund – 4 times (1998, 2000, 2004, 2006)
Jyrki Lumme – 4 (1992, 1994, 1996, 1997)
Doug Lidster – 4 (1985, 1986, 1987, 1991)
Harold Snepsts – 4 (1978, 1979, 1980, 1982)
Alexander Edler – 3 (2012, 2018, 2019)
Ed Jovanovski – 3 (2001, 2002, 2003)
Quinn Hughes – 3 (2020, 2021, 2022)

Award winners 

  Player is still active with the Canucks.

See also
Cyclone Taylor Trophy
Cyrus H. McLean Trophy
Fred J. Hume Award
Molson Cup
Pavel Bure Most Exciting Player Award

References

External links
 Canucks Team Award Winners

Vancouver Canucks trophies and awards